David Mayes Middleton II (born September 18, 1981) is an American businessman and politician serving as a member of the Texas Senate for the 11th district. Previously, he served as a Texas House of Representatives for District 23. A member of the Republican Party, Middleton has been in the Texas legislature since January 8, 2019.

Early life and education
David Mayes Middleton II was born in Wallisville, Texas, an unincorporated town in northern Chambers County, Texas. Middleton's father, John Gregg Middleton, named his son after his deceased brother, David Mayes Middleton. Middleton is also the great-grandson of Effie Mayes and Archie David Middleton. Middleton received degrees in finance from the University of Texas at Austin, and a Juris Doctor from University of Texas Law School.

Business career
Middleton serves as president of Middleton Oil Company, an independent oil and gas company that operates in South Texas and the Gulf Coast. Middleton Oil Company currently claims three employees, and generates an estimated annual revenue of ~$800,000. Middleton owns and manages ranching, cattle, and farming operations in Chambers, Jefferson, Kimble, Liberty, and Webb Counties. He serves on the Board of Directors of First Liberty National Bank, a community bank with locations in the Texas cities of Baytown, China, Dayton, Hardin, Huffman, and Liberty.

Political career
Middleton serves in the Texas House of Representatives for district 23. He is the Chairman of the Texas Freedom Caucus.

Texas House of Representatives
Middleton was first elected to the Texas House of Representatives in November 2018 Middleton was re-elected in 2020. 
2018
In the 2018 primary election, he successfully challenged two-term incumbent representative Wayne Faircloth, an ally of House Speaker Joe Straus. In the November 6, 2018, general election Middleton defeated Democrat Amanda Jamrock.
2020
Middleton ran unopposed in the Republican primary election held on March 3, 2020. He defeated Democrat Jeff Antonelli in the 2020 general election.

House committee assignments
 87th Legislative Session
 Insurance
 Judiciary & Civil Jurisprudence
 Local & Consent Calendars
 State Water Implementation Fund for Texas Advisory
 Texas Infrastructure Resiliency Fund Advisory
 86th Legislative Session
 Co-chair, Coastal Barrier System
 Elections
 Local & Consent Calendars
 Urban Affairs

2022 Texas Senate Race
On November 30, 2021, Middleton filed to run for the Texas Senate for District 11.

On December 28, 2021, Middleton announced the endorsement of former US president Donald Trump. In a statement endorsing Middleton's senate race, Trump called Middleton "a very effective leader in the Texas House" and said his "voting record on conservative issues is second to none." In his closing statement endorsing Middleton, Trump wrote, "I am proud to give my Complete and Total Endorsement to a MAGA champion, Mayes Middleton."

Middleton ran unopposed in the 2022 general election, which he was then declared elected.

Personal life
He and his wife, Macy, have four children. He is a Christian. The Middleton Family currently resides in a home located on the east-end of Galveston Island. The Middleton family also own a home in Wallisville, Texas built by Middleton's great-grandparents in 1905.

He serves on the Board of Directors for the Wallisville Heritage Park, a historical museum in Chambers County, Texas.

Middleton is a former member of the board of directors of the Texas Public Policy Foundation (TPPF). He was elected to the board in January 2016, but had to relinquish his seat in June 2017 when he announced his candidacy for the Texas House of Representatives due to a requirement in the foundation's bylaws.

In 2017, he served as a member of the Executive Committee for the Texas Business Leadership Council, a 501(c)(6) nonprofit organization consisting of a network of Texas based CEOs and business executives that advocates for free enterprise public policies in Texas government.

References

Living people
21st-century American politicians
Republican Party members of the Texas House of Representatives
People from Chambers County, Texas
University of Texas at Austin alumni
University of Texas School of Law alumni
1981 births